Ede Király (23 February 1926 – 10 August 2009) was a Hungarian figure skater. As a competitor in men's singles, he was a three-time World medalist (silver in 1949 and 1950, bronze in 1948), the 1950 European champion, and a six-time Hungarian national champion. Competing in pairs with Andrea Kékesy, he became the 1948 Olympic silver medalist, the 1949 World champion, and a two-time European champion (1948–1949).

In the 1950s, Király became a coach in Oshawa, Ontario, Canada.

Results

Men's singles

Pairs with Kékesy

References

External links

Navigation
 

1926 births
2009 deaths
Hungarian male single skaters
Hungarian male pair skaters
Olympic figure skaters of Hungary
Olympic silver medalists for Hungary
Figure skaters at the 1948 Winter Olympics
Olympic medalists in figure skating
World Figure Skating Championships medalists
European Figure Skating Championships medalists
Medalists at the 1948 Winter Olympics
Figure skaters from Budapest